At Close Range is a 1986 American neo-noir crime drama film directed by James Foley, based on the real life rural Pennsylvania crime family led by Bruce Johnston Sr. which operated during the 1960s and 1970s. It stars Sean Penn and Christopher Walken, with Mary Stuart Masterson, Sean's brother Chris Penn, David Strathairn, Crispin Glover, Kiefer Sutherland, and Eileen Ryan in supporting roles.

Plot
Brad Whitewood Sr. is a career criminal and the leader of his family's gang of rural backwoods criminals. Sr's criminal enterprises intersect when his son, Brad Whitewood Jr., a floundering, out-of-work teenager living in near squalor with his mother, grandmother, brother and mother's boyfriend, comes to stay with him. When his father shows up in a flashy car with a pocket full of hundred dollar bills, Brad Jr. formulates a desire to join his father's life of crime. At first Jr. starts a gang with his brother, Tommy, fencing their stolen goods through Brad Sr.'s criminal network. As a result of entanglements with his 16-year-old girlfriend, Terry, Brad Jr. seeks full entry into his father's gang, but after witnessing a murder he tries to back out. Eventually Brad Jr's gang is arrested while attempting to steal tractors, and the FBI and local law enforcement attempt to lean on Brad Jr. to get him to turn evidence on his father's gang.

During Brad Jr.'s time in jail, Brad Sr. becomes convinced that Terry is a risk to his activities, thinking that Brad Jr. may confide details to Terry and that she has a big mouth. In an attempt to destroy her relationship with Brad Jr., Brad Sr. rapes Terry after getting her drunk and stoned. After a prison visit where Terry, accompanied by Brad Jr's mother, has a conversation with Brad Jr., it seems that Brad Jr. begins to cooperate with the police. The members of Brad Jr's gang are subpoenaed, and Brad Sr. feels his only recourse is to eliminate them. The gang kills Lucas, Aggie and Tommy. Brad Jr. and Terry plan to flee to Montana, but they are ambushed. Terry is killed, and Brad Jr. is seriously wounded. Brad Jr. confronts his father armed with his father's gun, intending on killing him, but decides instead to cooperate with police.

Ultimately Brad Jr. sits on the witness stand in his father's trial.

Cast
 Sean Penn as Bradford "Brad" Whitewood Jr.
 Christopher Walken as Bradford "Brad" Whitewood Sr.
 Mary Stuart Masterson as Terry
 Chris Penn as Thomas "Tommy" Whitewood
 Millie Perkins as Julie
 Eileen Ryan as Grandma
 Tracey Walter as Uncle Patch Whitewood
 R. D. Call as Dickie
 David Strathairn as Tony Pine
 J. C. Quinn as Boyd
 Candy Clark as Mary Sue
 Jake Dengel as Lester
 Kiefer Sutherland as Tim
 Crispin Glover as Lucas
 Stephen Geoffreys as Aggie
 Alan Autry as Ernie
 Noelle Parker as Jill

Production

Filming
The movie, while depicting incidents in Chester County and Lancaster County, Pennsylvania, was actually filmed in Franklin, Tennessee and Spring Hill, Tennessee.

Soundtrack
Music for the film was composed by Patrick Leonard, who had been working on an instrumental theme for Fire with Fire, and wanted to enlist Madonna for the vocals. Leonard was turned down by Paramount for that project, but Madonna, who was at the time married to Sean Penn, decided that the theme would work well for At Close Range. She composed the lyrics and presented a demo cassette to director James Foley, and suggested Leonard compose the film's soundtrack. The theme with Madonna's lyrics became the single "Live to Tell". A slower instrumental version opened the film's main title sequence, a harbinger of the end credit sequence, which was accompanied by the version from Madonna's album True Blue. Versions of the instrumental show up throughout. The instrumental score by Leonard remained unreleased until a version of the main titles appeared on the Internet in 2014, although the 45 single of "Live to Tell" included a B-side incomplete instrumental version of the score.

The music to the film included a number of singles from the late ‘70s, including "Miss You" by The Rolling Stones, "Boogie Oogie Oogie" by A Taste of Honey, as well as a number of arrangements featuring LeRoux.

Reception

Critical reception
Roger Ebert gave the At Close Range 3½ (out of 4) stars, noting that "few recent films have painted such a bleak picture of human nature". He described Penn as "probably the best of the younger actors", while lauding Walken's "hateful" performance.

At Rotten Tomatoes, the film has an approval rating of 87% based on 23 reviews, with an average score of 7.2/10.

Box office
Despite the accolades and warm reviews, the film was not a box office success.  It grossed a total of $2,347,000 at the North American box office during its theatrical run in 83 theaters, earning less than its production budget of $6.5 million.

Awards
 Nominated Golden Bear, 36th Berlin International Film Festival.
 Winner ASCAP Film & Television Music Award – Most Performed Song from Motion Picture ("Live to Tell"); awarded to performer Madonna
 Winner BMI Film & TV Award – Most Performed Song from a Film ("Live to Tell"); awarded to composer Patrick Leonard
 Nominated Casting Society of America – Best Casting in Feature Film (Risa Bramon Garcia, Billy Hopkins)

See also
 List of American films of 1986
 Bruce Johnston Sr.
 "Live to Tell"

References

External links

 
 
 

1986 films
1986 crime drama films
1986 independent films
American crime drama films
American independent films
1980s English-language films
Films about dysfunctional families
Drama films based on actual events
Films directed by James Foley
Films set in Pennsylvania
Films set in 1978
Orion Pictures films
Crime films based on actual events
American neo-noir films
Films about father–son relationships
1980s American films